The year 1929 was marked, in science fiction, by the following events.

Births and deaths

Births 
 January 28 : Parke Godwin, American writer, (died 2013)
 July 9 : Zheng Wenguang, Chinese writer, (died 2003)
 July 10 : George Clayton Johnson, American writer, (died 2015)
 August 27 : Ira Levin, American writer, (died 2007)
 October 1 :  Demètre Ioakimidis, French writer and anthologist (died 2012)
 December 27 : Philippe Curval, French writer

Deaths

Events 
 Creation of the American magazine Wonder Stories, edited by Hugo Gernsback.

Literary releases

Novels 
  Mond-Rak 1, by Otfrid von Hanstein.
  The Air Seller by Alexander Belayev.

Stories collections

Short stories 
  The last man, by Wallace West.
  The Killing Flash, by Hugo Gernsback.
 The Disintegration Machine, by Arthur Conan Doyle.

Comics

Audiovisual outputs

Movies 
 Woman in the Moon, by Fritz Lang.
 High Treason, by Maurice Elvey.

Awards 
The main science-fiction Awards known at the present time did not exist at this time.

See also 
 1929 in science
 1928 in science fiction
 1930 in science fiction

References

Science fiction by year

science-fiction